The WebSocket protocol is implemented in different  web browsers, web servers, and run-time environments and libraries acting as clients or servers. The following is a table of different features of notable WebSocket implementations.

Notes

Web technology
Network socket
WebSocket implementations